Zsolt Koncz (born 18 September 1977 in Szentes) is a Hungarian football player who currently plays for Ceglédi VSE.

References
This article has been written based on the Magyar version of Wikipedia *:hu:Koncz Zsolt
Player profile at HLSZ 

1977 births
Living people
People from Szentes
Hungarian footballers
Association football midfielders
Szentes FC footballers
Orosháza FC players
Kecskeméti TE players
Ceglédi VSE footballers
Nemzeti Bajnokság I players
Sportspeople from Csongrád-Csanád County